Cocktails is the ninth studio album by American rapper Too Short. It was released on January 24, 1995 via Jive Records, making it his sixth album on the label. It is certified platinum and features performances by 2Pac, Ant Banks and The Dangerous Crew. Cocktails debuted at #6 on the Billboard 200 chart, selling 101,000 copies in its first week, in all it sold over 1 million copies and was certified platinum by the RIAA. It was Too Short's second album to reach #1 on the Top R&B/Hip-Hop Albums chart, while missing the Top 5 by one position on the Billboard 200. The album was entirely produced by Ant Banks.

Track listing

Charts

Weekly charts

Year-end charts

See also
 List of number-one R&B albums of 1995 (U.S.)

References

Too Short albums
1995 albums
Albums produced by Ant Banks
Jive Records albums